Lirceus culveri, the Rye Cove cave isopod, is a species of isopod in the family Asellidae. It is found in North America.

The IUCN conservation status of Lirceus culveri is "VU", vulnerable. The species faces a high risk of endangerment in the medium term. The IUCN status was reviewed in 1996.

References

Isopoda
Articles created by Qbugbot
Crustaceans described in 1976